Daniel Michael Rodriguez Arrocha (born 9 January 1995) is a Danish footballer who plays as a centre-back for Mjøndalen IF.

Career
Arrocha joined Norwegian First Division side Nest-Sotra in the summer of 2018. He moved to Jerv in May 2020. He missed the whole of the 2020 season due to injury. On 3 April 2022, he made his Eliteserien debut in a 1–0 win against Strømsgodset. On 31 August 2022, Arrocha moved to Mjøndalen IF.

References

External links

1995 births
Living people
Danish men's footballers
Danish expatriate men's footballers
Association football defenders
HB Køge players
Øygarden FK players
Nest-Sotra Fotball players
FK Jerv players
Mjøndalen IF players
Danish 1st Division players
Norwegian First Division players
Eliteserien players
Expatriate footballers in Norway
Danish expatriate sportspeople in Norway